The Viking Club was a club for philologists and historians specializing in Germanic and Scandinavian studies. It was founded by E.V. Gordon and J. R. R. Tolkien when the two were professors at Leeds University in the 1920s. At meetings of the club students and faculty would gather to read Old Icelandic sagas and drink together in an informal setting. Members of the club also invented original songs and poems in Old English, Gothic, Old Norse and other extinct Germanic languages. A collection of these works was privately published as Songs for the Philologists, of which most of the printed editions were destroyed in a fire. Only a very few copies are believed to have survived. Following Gordon's departure, the student magazine The Gryphon remarked that 'old students will note with pleasure that Dr. A. H. Smith is now President of the Viking Club’, indicating that the student society that Tolkien and Gordon had established had in some sense survived Gordon’s departure and was in the hands of Albert Hugh Smith (1903–67), a Leeds graduate who in 1930 had taken up a lectureship at University College London.

Similar groups have continued at Leeds University since the time of Tolkien and Gordon. As of 2015 the successor of the Viking Club was known as the Old Norse Reading Group, and associated with Gordon's distant successor, Alaric Hall.

See also

 Inklings

References

Germanic studies
Old Norse literature
J. R. R. Tolkien
English philologists
University of Leeds